Thoressa honorei, commonly known as the Madras ace, is a skipper butterfly belonging to the family Hesperiidae found in south India.

Description

References

External links
 

h